is a Japanese composer, arranger and lyricist best known for his role on the soundtrack of many anime series. His works include the scores for Attack on Titan: The Final Season and 86—with the latter winning the 8th Anime Trending Awards in the category Best Soundtrack.

Biography 
Yamamoto was born in Tokyo, in 1987. His musician career started in 2015, with him writing songs for other artists. In 2017, alongside Hiroyuki Sawano, Yamamoto made his debut as a composer in the anime Blue Exorcist: Kyoto Saga, the sequel of the popular series Blue Exorcist. Since then, he has been involved in many soundtrack works, several of which with composer Hiroyuki Sawano.

In February 2022, Yamamoto and Sawano were awarded at the Anime Trending Awards for their role on the soundtrack of the anime 86.

On November 13, 2022, Yamamoto attended an orchestral concert event for the concluding season of Attack on Titan. The event was held at Tokyo's Tachikawa Stage Garden, with him performing tracks from the Attack on Titan'''s score.

Yamamoto also attended the 7th Crunchyroll Anime Awards on March 4, 2023, performing the track "Ashes on the Fire" from Attack on Titan: The Final Season''.

Works

Anime

Television dramas

Video games

Other involvements

References

External links 
  
 Discography at VGMdb
 
 

1987 births
21st-century Japanese male musicians
21st-century Japanese composers
Anime composers
Living people
Musicians from Tokyo
Male television composers